The Dubai Islamic Bank (DIB) is an Islamic bank in Dubai, established in 1975 by Saeed Bin Ahmed Lootah. It is the first Islamic bank in the world to have incorporated the principles of Islam in all its practices and is the largest Islamic bank in the UAE.

Bank

Established in 1975, Dubai Islamic Bank is the largest Islamic bank in the UAE by assets and a public joint-stock company listed on the Dubai Financial Market. 
Spearheading the evolution of the global Islamic finance industry, DIB is also the world's first full-service Islamic bank and the third-largest Islamic bank in the world. The Bank currently operates 90 branches across the UAE, is present in seven markets worldwide and is expanding its global footprint to further grow and develop the industry. Serving close to 1.7 million customers, DIB offers its growing consumer base an increasing range of innovative Sharia-compliant products and services.

DIB Significant Subsidiaries and Associates
Dar Al Sharia: Dar Al-Sharia is a Sharia legal and financial consultancy firm established in 2008.

Dubai Islamic Bank Pakistan: Dubai Islamic Bank Pakistan was established in 2006 as a fully owned subsidiary.

Panin Dubai Syariah Bank: 38.3% ownership in a Shariah compliant player in Indonesia, which has one of the largest Muslim populations in the world.

Bank of Khartoum: DIB holds a stake in Bank of Khartoum, one of the largest banks in Sudan.

Deyaar: Deyaar Development is a real estate development company established in 2002.

Bosna Bank International: Bosna Bank International was established in 2000 as the first Sharia-compliant bank in Europe.

DIB Bank Kenya Limited: License obtained from Central Bank of Kenya (CBK) in May 2017 exclusively to offer Shariah compliant banking services in Kenya.

Services

Dubai Islamic Bank offers corporate, as well as, personal, SME, and priority banking services all across Pakistan. With a variety of accounts, DIB gives its users access to conventional cash management, online payments, business financing, and saving services.

Financial Performance 
For the year 2022, Dubai Islamic Bank (SIB) has posted a group net profit of AED 5.6 billion.

See also 

 Noor Bank
 Mashreq

References

External links
Official website

Banks of the United Arab Emirates
Companies based in Dubai
Companies listed on the Dubai Financial Market
Emirati companies established in 1975
Banks established in 1975
Multinational companies headquartered in the United Arab Emirates